VIP Bazar Metro Station is a station of Line 6 of the Kolkata Metro in India, serving Tiljala and VIP Nagar areas.

See also
List of Kolkata Metro stations

Kolkata Metro stations
Railway stations in Kolkata